The 25th Legislative Assembly of Saskatchewan was in power from  2003 until November 20, 2007. It was controlled by the Saskatchewan New Democratic Party under premier Lorne Calvert.

Members

By-elections
 The member for Weyburn-Big Muddy, Brenda Bakken-Lackey, resigned in February 2006.  On May 19, 2006, Premier Lorne Calvert called a by-election for June 19, 2006. The by-election was won by Dustin Duncan of the Saskatchewan Party.
 The member for Martensville, Ben Heppner, died on September 24, 2006.  A by-election was held on March 5, 2007. The by-election was won by Nancy Heppner, Ben's daughter, of the Saskatchewan Party.

Party standings

Seating Plan

Official Seating Plan (pdf format)

References
 

Terms of the Saskatchewan Legislature